An Internment Serial Number (ISN) is an identification number assigned to captives who come under control of the United States Department of Defense (DoD) during armed conflicts.

History 
On March 3, 2006, in compliance with a court order from District Judge Jed S. Rakoff, the DoD released 57 files that contained transcripts from the Guantanamo Bay inmates' Combatant Status Review Tribunals (CSRT) and Administrative Review Board hearings.  
These transcripts were only identified by the prisoners' ISNs.

On April 20, 2006, the DoD released the first of two official lists of captives, which contained the captives' ISNs, names, and nationalities.
That list provided information about the 558 Guantanamo captives whom the DoD acknowledges were held in Guantanamo in August 2004 and whose status as "enemy combatants" was confirmed or disputed by a CSRT.

On May 15, 2006, the DoD released a longer list of 759 individuals, which they asserted listed all those who had been held in military custody at Guantanamo.

The two lists contain incompatible names for numerous individuals. Several dozen men who are known to have been held in Guantanamo are not present on either official list.

A ghost detainee originally known only as Triple X was not assigned an ISN because his secret imprisonment was requested by the Central Intelligence Agency.

On January 16, 2010, the DoD published a list of 645 captives who were held in the Bagram Theater internment facility, in Afghanistan.
Historian Andy Worthington, author of The Guantanamo Files: The Stories of the 774 Detainees in America's Illegal Prison, published an annotated version of the list, in which he noted that the numbers were not always assigned sequentially.  Three former Guantanamo captives were re-apprehended after their release, and are held in Bagram under their original ISN.

See also
Guantanamo Bay files leak

References

External links
Guantánamo's faceless victims guardian.co.uk

Guantanamo Bay captives legal and administrative procedures
Serial numbers